Rosa Albina Garavito (born 7 March 1947 in Santa Cruz, Sonora) is a Mexican politician and scholar.

A graduate of the Universidad Autónoma de Nuevo León (UANL), Garavito has served in the lower and upper house of the Mexican Congress representing the Party of the Democratic Revolution (PRD). She taught at the Autonomous University of Baja California (UABC), UANL and Universidad Autónoma Metropolitana (UAM) Azcapotzalco campus.

References

Living people
1947 births
Members of the Chamber of Deputies (Mexico)
Members of the Senate of the Republic (Mexico)
Women members of the Senate of the Republic (Mexico)
Party of the Democratic Revolution politicians
Women members of the Chamber of Deputies (Mexico)
Autonomous University of Nuevo León alumni
Academic staff of the Autonomous University of Baja California
Academic staff of the Autonomous University of Nuevo León
Academic staff of Universidad Autónoma Metropolitana
20th-century Mexican politicians
20th-century Mexican women politicians